The Tara expedition is an oceanic research expedition.

The boat
Tara is a 36-metre aluminum-hulled schooner, formerly named "Antarctica" then "Seamaster". Designed by the naval architects Olivier Petit and Luc Bouvet, built in France on the initiative of Jean-Louis Étienne, medical explorer, in 1989 the schooner Antarctica was used from 1991 to 1996 by Jean-Louis Étienne for scientific expeditions in Antarctica, at the Erebus volcano and then wintering at Spitzberg. Under its former name, it was owned by Peter Blake, who was shot and killed in 2001 by pirates while sailing Seamaster on the Amazon River. Following Blake's death, the yacht was bought by Etienne Bourgois, renamed Tara and dedicated to environmental expeditions.

Expeditions

Tara Arctic 
The polar schooner Tara set out to drift in the ice for approximately two years from its first departure, late in August 2006. The expedition met with interest in the oceanography community, especially in the context of the International Polar Year (2007–2008). Dubbed Tara Arctic, this voyage ended on February 23, 2008. It was part of the international DAMOCLES (Developing Arctic Modelling and Observing Capabilities for Long-term Environmental Studies) program.

Tara Oceans 
In 2009, Tara started a new expedition, dubbed Tara Oceans. It travelled around the world until 2013 to study CO2 capture by marine microorganisms such as plankton on a global scale. The costs of the expedition were €3 million per year, all from private funds. The expedition was primarily funded by the French fashion designer agnès b., however, it was a collaborative effort between the Tara Expeditions Foundation, the French National Center for Scientific Research (CNRS) and 17 other international partner institutions. It was able to collect more than 35,000 planktonic samples from 210 stations in every major oceanic region, which through analyses revealed more than 40 million genes, most of which were new to science.

The samples were analyzed using a combination of DNA sequencing and microscopy. Of the 40+ million genes identified, the two biggest match domains were 58.8% bacteria and 5.4% viruses. 27.7% were not able to be matched with any currently known domains of life. This fact underscores the vast unknown biological components of the world’s oceans.

In addition to uncovering unknown marine biodiversity, the Tara Oceans Expedition helped us to understand the role of marine microbes in the global ecosystem, address the impacts of climate change on marine life and improve ocean conservation efforts.

One of the other goals of Tara Oceans was to allow open access archives of both raw and validated data sets to scientists around the world as quickly as possible. Links to all of the data sets can be found at https://www.ebi.ac.uk/services/tara-oceans-data. As part of the expedition's public outreach efforts, a short series of documentary videos called The Plankton Chronicles which merged science and art was created by the Villefranche-sur-Mer Marine Station.

Tara Mediterranean 

Tara Mediterranean was the next expedition that took place over seven months in 2014. It traversed the entire Mediterranean Sea with the goal better understanding the sources, transport, distribution and characteristics of surface floating plastic. One of the major discoveries was that of the 2000 samples taken on the cruise at 300 different sites, all of the samples contained plastic fragments.

Tara Pacific 
Tara Pacific began in May 2016.  During this latest voyage Tara is studying coral reefs and plastic pollution.

See also 
Fram (ship)
Georgy Sedov expedition
Soviet and Russian staffed drifting ice stations

References

External links
Official site

 (A Lecture by Eric Karsenti)

Schooners
Arctic expeditions
1989 ships
21st century in the Arctic
2006 in science
2007 in science
Ships attacked and captured by pirates
Research vessels of France